Heart of the Warrior is a 2000 Spanish action-adventure film directed and written by Daniel Monzón, which stars Fernando Ramallo, Joel Joan and Neus Asensi, also featuring Santiago Segura, Adrià Collado, and Javier Aller, among others.

Plot 
Playing with Don Quixote tropes, the plot follows the story of Ramón, a teen from Madrid obsessed with sword and sorcery fiction. Ramón creates an alternative self as the warrior Beldar, who partners with warrior princess Sonya.

Cast

Production 
It is Monzón's debut film. He also wrote it. Gerardo Herrero took over production duties. A Tornasol Films and Creativos Asociados de Radio y Televisión production, the film had a 500 million peseta budget. The score was composed by Roque Baños. Filming took 11 weeks.

Release 
The film was screened in Lanzarote in December 1999 during a film industry meeting with European distributors. It was theatrically released in Spain on 21 January 2000.

Accolades 

|-
| align = "center" rowspan = "4" | 2001 || rowspan = "2" | 15th Goya Awards || Best New Director || Daniel Monzón ||  || align = "center" rowspan = "2" | 
|-
| Best Production Supervision || Tino Pont ||  
|}

See also 
 List of Spanish films of 2000

References 
Citations

Bibliography
 
 

Spanish fantasy adventure films
Spanish action adventure films
2000s Spanish-language films
Films set in Madrid
Sword and sorcery films
Tornasol Films films
2000s Spanish films
2000s adventure films